Hank Green and the Perfect Strangers is an American rock band. The band's lineup consists of Hank Green (lead vocals, rhythm guitar), Rob Scallon (drums), Joe DeGeorge (keyboards, saxophone, backing vocals), and Andrew Huang (guitars, bass, vocals). In live performances they are joined by Paul DeGeorge (bass). Their debut album, Incongruent, peaked at number 3 on the Billboard Comedy Albums chart. They have toured alongside acts such as Driftless Pony Club and Harry and the Potters.

Green has cited punk rock acts such as The Mr. T Experience and Green Day as being influential on the band.

Discography
Incongruent (2014)

References

American rock music groups
Works by the Green brothers